Space is the second EP by American metalcore band The Devil Wears Prada. The album was released on August 21, 2015, through Rise Records. It is the group's first release without guitarist Chris Rubey.
It is also the band's second conceptual release, after the release of their concept EP Zombie EP, in which they embarked on a five-year anniversary tour earlier in 2015. This is the last release by The Devil Wears Prada to feature original drummer Daniel Williams after he departed with the band in July 2016.

Composition
Vocalist Mike Hranica described the album as being very "thematic". Brian Leak of Alternative Press referred to the EP's sound as "spacecore".

"Planet A" is about the astronaut Elizabeth, who experiences a malfunction that sets off the events of the EP.
"Asteroid" is credited in the album notes as "An Asteroid Towards Earth".

Promotion and release
A music video was released for the track "Planet A", being uploaded to Rise's official YouTube channel on August 20, 2015. The EP was released the next day on August 21, 2015, through Rise Records, the group's first release on the label since 2007's Plagues. Hranica stated that the band felt confident in working with the label again.

Track listing

Personnel
The Devil Wears Prada
 Mike Hranica – lead vocals, additional guitars
 Jeremy DePoyster – rhythm guitar, vocals
 Andy Trick – bass
 Daniel Williams – drums

Additional musicians
 Kyle Sipress – lead guitar
 Jonathon Gering – keyboards

Charts

References

2015 EPs
Rise Records EPs
The Devil Wears Prada (band) albums
Concept albums